The Mexican weeping bamboo, Otatea acuminata, is a clumping bamboo native to central and southern Mexico and Central America.

The plant produces thick stands of culms with long narrow leaves.  The weight of the leaves cause the long thin culms to bend, or weep. The clump's vegetation can reach  or more in height and width in its native habitat..

Cultivation
Otatea acuminata and its cultivars are cultivated as an ornamental plant, often planted in subtropical and temperate climate gardens in full or partial sun. The plant is  drought tolerant when established, but benefits from periodic watering and feeding. When planted in the ground it can reach  or more with regular water.

Mexican Weeping Bamboo is easy to propagate by dividing the root ball with a sharp spade.  A particularly delicate look can be achieved by thinning the culms so that they are spaced   or more apart.  This allows dappled light to pass through the Mexican Weeping Bamboo, and the plant will sway gracefully in a gentle breeze.

Otatea acuminata is a fast-growing clumping bamboo which can spread  in each direction yearly. It is well suited to the climate and soil in Southern California, and can be successfully grown and propagated with minimal effort.  Unlike many other bamboo species, the leaves do not brown at the tips even under suboptimal growing conditions.

Subspecies and cultivars
There are several subspecies and cultivars, including:
 Otatea acuminata subsp. acuminata
 Otatea acuminata subsp. aztecorum — the most commonly cultivated ornamental plant.
 Otatea acuminata 'Dwarf'
 Otatea acuminata 'Mayan Silver'
 Otatea acuminata 'Michoacan'

References

External links

Bambusoideae
Flora of Central America
Flora of Chiapas
Grasses of Mexico
Grasses of North America
Garden plants of North America
Garden plants of Central America
Drought-tolerant plants